José Rizal (1861–1896) is a national hero of the Philippines.

José Rizal  or Jose Rizal may also refer to:

José Rizal University, a private university in the Philippines
Jose Rizal Heavy Bombers, the varsity team of Jose Rizal University
José Rizal (film), a 1998 biographical film on the life of José Rizal
Jose Rizal Memorial State University, a public university in the Philippines
Bust of José Rizal, a sculpture by Lorena Toritch

Rizal, Jose